Brandon Mull is an American author best known for his children's fantasy series, Fablehaven, as well as Dragonwatch, The Candy Shop War, the Beyonders trilogy, and the Five Kingdoms series.  He also began the Spirit Animals series.

In June of 2020, Mull married Erlyn Madsen. Together, they have a total of eleven children, with four from his previous marriage and seven from hers. 

He is inspired by J. R. R. Tolkien, C. S. Lewis, and J. K. Rowling.

Education and early work 
Brandon Mull went to Mt. Diablo Elementary School in Clayton, California, United States. Mull then attended Pine Hollow Middle School as a student, and then attended Clayton Valley. He currently lives in Alpine, Utah and is a graduate of Brigham Young University in Utah. While at BYU Mull led the sketch comedy group Divine Comedy. Mull served a two-year mission for the Church of Jesus Christ of Latter-day Saints in Chile.

As a child, Mull was known for a strong imagination.  He would sometimes spend hours in his bedroom, without toys just imagining and acting out stories that were in his head. In school, his constant day dreaming sometimes irritated teachers while others encouraged his imagination.

Career 
Mull has worked as a comedian, a filing clerk, a patio installer, a movie promoter, a copywriter, and briefly as a chicken stacker.

Mull's first attempt at publishing a novel failed and was never published. The failure led him to a job working as a marketer for the film Saints and Soldiers. It wasn't until after the film company he worked for was acquired by a publishing company that Mull successfully published his first novel, Fablehaven.

Fablehaven is currently optioned by Schaffer Studios.

Published works

Fablehaven Series

Fablehaven 
Fablehaven is about siblings Seth and Kendra Sorenson who find out their grandfather and grandmother run Fablehaven, one of the magical reserves where mythical creatures can live in peace.

 Fablehaven, Shadow Mountain, June 14, 2006,  
 Fablehaven: Rise of the Evening Star, Shadow Mountain, May 1, 2007, 
 Fablehaven: Grip of the Shadow Plague, Shadow Mountain, April 12, 2008, 
 Fablehaven: Secrets of the Dragon Sanctuary, Shadow Mountain, March 24, 2009, 
 Fablehaven: Keys to the Demon Prison, Shadow Mountain, March 23, 2010, 
 The Caretaker's Guide to Fablehaven, Shadow Mountain, October 13, 2015,

Dragonwatch
Dragonwatch is a sequel series to Fablehaven that  spans 5 books. Books 1, 2, and 3 were released March 2017, October 2018, and October 2019 respectively, book 4 was released October 2020; book 5 was released in October 2021. In the story the dragons will seek to escape the sanctuaries they've been placed in, seeing them as prisons. The only thing that can keep them under control is the order of the Dragonwatch, but most of the Dragonwatch members have died of old age. A wizard named Agad decides to seek out Grandpa Sorensen for help, and in the process Kendra and Seth. Kendra and Seth will have to unite forces to become dragon tamers and caretakers of Wyrmroost to keep the dragons from escaping.

A prequel called Legend of the Dragon Slayer was published between the fourth and fifth books.

Dragonwatch: A Fablehaven Adventure, Shadow Mountain, March 14, 2017, 
Dragonwatch: Wrath of the Dragon King, Shadow Mountain, October 23, 2018, 
Dragonwatch: Master of the Phantom Isle, Shadow Mountain, October 1, 2019, 
Dragonwatch: Champion of the Titan Games, Shadow Mountain, October 13, 2020, 
Dragonwatch: Return of the Dragon Slayers, Shadow Mountain, October 26, 2021, 
Legend of the Dragon Slayer: The Origin Story of Dragonwatch , Shadow Mountain, May 4, 2021,

Beyonders 
Beyonders is a series about a teenage boy named Jason who gets summoned as the last chance to save Lyrian, a doomed realm ruled by the wizard Maldor.

Beyonders: A World Without Heroes, Aladdin, March 15, 2011, 
Beyonders: Seeds of Rebellion, Aladdin, March 13, 2012, 
Beyonders: Chasing the Prophecy, Aladdin, March 12, 2013,

Five Kingdoms 
Five Kingdoms is a series about a 12-year-old boy named Cole who was about to get enslaved by slave traders but at the last moment, he hides while his friends are being sucked away to another world called the Outskirts. Cole decides he should save them and ends up being enslaved as well. In the Outskirts, there are five kingdoms, each with a very different system of magic, that correspond roughly to the five books.

Five Kingdoms: Sky Raiders, Aladdin, March 11, 2014, 
Five Kingdoms: Rogue Knight, Aladdin, November 18, 2014, 
Five Kingdoms: Crystal Keepers, Aladdin, March 17, 2015, 
Five Kingdoms: Death Weavers, Aladdin, March 15, 2016, 
Five Kingdoms: Time Jumpers, Aladdin, March 13, 2018,

Candy Shop War
Candy Shop War follows Nate in a strange town full of magical candies and crazy arcades.

 The Candy Shop War, Shadow Mountain, September 11, 2007, 
 Arcade Catastrophe, Shadow Mountain, October 23, 2012, 
 Carnival Quest, Shadow Mountain, Expected Publication Date March 14, 2023

Pingo
 Pingo, illustrated by Brandon Dorman, Shadow Mountain, August 5, 2009, 
 Pingo and the Playground Bully – Prequel to Pingo, illustrated by Brandon Dorman, Shadow Mountain, October 9, 2012,

Smarter Than A Monster: A Survival Guide
Smarter Than A Monster is a picture book aimed at helping kids overcome their fear of monsters by teaching good habits, such as brushing their teeth. 

 Smarter Than A Monster: A Survival Guide, illustrated by Mike Walton, Shadow Mountain, October 1, 2019,

Spirit Animals
Brandon Mull spearheaded a multi-book series called Spirit Animals.  Each book is written by a different author but based in the same fantasy world.

Mull has written one full book in the series: Wild Born (Book 1), and select stories in Special Edition: Tales of the Great Beasts (October 21, 2014) and Special Edition: Tales of the Fallen Beasts (February 23, 2016). Wild Born tells the story of four 11-year-old kids (Conor from Eura, Meilin from Zhong, Rollan from Amaya, and Abeke from Nilo) who summon the legendary Four Fallen (Briggan with Connor, Jhi with Meilin, Essix with Rollan, and Uraza with Abeke). The kids must work together to find the first talisman with the Greencloaks, leading to a heroic battle against the Ravens and the Conquerors. The first Special Edition covers the story of the four great beasts: Briggan the Wolf, Uraza the Leopard, Jhi the Panda, and Essix the Falcon before they sacrifice themselves to protect the land and become the legendary Four Fallen Spirit Animals. The second special edition features the story of the betrayal of the great beast Gerathon.

Mull also contributed to True Heroes: A Treasury of Modern Fairy Tales, a short story anthology inspired by real children with cancer.

References

External links
 

1974 births
21st-century American novelists
American fantasy writers
Latter Day Saints from California
American Mormon missionaries in Chile
Brigham Young University alumni
Fablehaven series
American male novelists
Living people
Place of birth missing (living people)
People from Clayton, California
Latter Day Saints from Utah
People from Highland, Utah
21st-century American male writers